Zahid Iftikhar Ahmed is a Pakistani television actor and former RJ. Ahmed worked as a creative manager for PTV World, and later became an RJ. Although successful, he left it to pursue a career in acting, and made his broadway debut with a leading role in the play It Runs in the Family (2006). He received widespread acclaim for his portrayal of Muhammad Ali Jinnah in Anwar Maqsood's, Sawa 14 August and its sequel Pawnay 14 August (both 2014). That same year, he made his television debut with the Hum TV romantic series Mehram. His breakout role in the Hum TV series Alvida (2015), garnered him the Hum Award for Best Villain, and a nomination for Best Supporting Actor. Subsequently, he received wide recognition for his portrayal of leading roles in several of the successful series, including Jugnoo (2015), Tum Mere Paas Raho (2015), Sangat (2015), Zara Yaad Kar (2016) and Besharam (2016).

Early life and education 
Zahid received his early education in Rawalpindi and graduated from Preston University in marketing. From 2003 to 2011, Zahid worked as a COO facilitator (corporate trainer) for sales and customer service operations in an IT company, however he left the job when company was discovered fraudulent and joined Pakistan Television Network's flagship channel PTV Home and later as a creative manager to launch an PTV World, where he met Anwar Maqsood and accept the offer to play Muhammad Ali Jinnah in Maqsood's theater Sawa 14 August.

Career 
Ahmed started his career as a RJ where he hosted Pakistani version of Australian morning shows The Breakfast Show and The Rush Hour for a year from 2002 to 2003, but left the show due to his job at call center in ISB. Due to his experience at radio, Zahid is a professional voice-over artist and has worked on various commercials for BBC, Nokia and is an official member of Voices.com.  He also plays a small role in unreleased film Cedare a joint production of Canada and Pakistan.

In 2006, Ahmed made his stage debut in a Pakistani adaptations of Ray Cooney's comedy play, It runs in the family where he portray Dr. David, and in 2007's musical, Bombay Dreams as Vikram. His performances in these plays earned him critical appraisal and in 2008, he went on to play Raoul de Chagny in universally acclaimed musical, Phantom of the Opera and John Smith in Cooney's magnum-opus, Run For Your Wife in 2011, while he continued to work as a trainer. However, his claim to fame came later when he accept the role of Muhammad Ali Jinnah in Anwar Maqsood's hit political-drama play, Sawa 14 August in 2013. Losing 48-pounds for the role he successfully plays the role in over 200 shows performed in Karachi, Lahore and Islamabad. He then quit his job at PTV to become a full-time actor and played Butt Sahab - a fat, bald blundering buffoon in another Maqsood's comedy-play Half Plate and reprise his role as Jinnah in Sawa 14 Augusts prequel Pawnay 14 August.

Ahmed made a television debut with series Mehram alongside Ayesha Khan, that earned him widespread acclaim and recognition. Sultana Siddiqui offered him the role after watching him at theater. He went on to star in hit drama serial Alvida alongside Imran Abbas Naqvi and Sanam Jung, where he portrayed the character Rameez a mentally disturbed husband of Jung, describing his character Ahmed said, "Rameez's passion for Haya is similar to Zahid's passion for acting." He established himself as a lead actor with these roles and appeared in four drama series in 2015 for Hum TV including Jugnoo, Tum Mere Paas Raho, Sangat (where he played the role of a rapist), and Zara Yaad Kar. For his debut work he was among the Best Television Sensation Male at 3rd Hum Awards but due to awards rules only winners received nomination and award, which he lost to Adnan Malik. He received three nominations at 4th Hum Awards including Best actor in a Supporting Role for Alvida, Best Actor in a Negative Role  for Alvida and Sangat.

In 2016, he played Haider Bakht in ARY Digital's drama series Besharam opposite Saba Qamar, Atiqa Odho and Rehan Sheikh. His performance received critical acclaim. He was cast in Geo Entertainment high-budget fantasy period drama series, Mor Mahal directed by Sarmad Sultan Khoosat which features ensemble cast including Umair Jaswal, Meesha Shafi, Sania Saeed, Fiza Ali, Jana Malik and Hina Khawaja Bayat. He portrayed the role of Kabeer who is a love interest of Meherbano (the third wife of Nawab Asif Jehan) and tasked by Meherbano to lure and murder first wife of Nawab Asif, Farrukh Zaad.

Television

Filmography

Stage

Radio shows

Awards and nominations

References

External links 
 

Living people
Hum Award winners
Best Actor in a Negative Role Hum Award winners
Punjabi people
Pakistani male television actors
Pakistani male stage actors
Pakistani theatre people
Pakistani radio presenters
Pakistani male radio actors
Male actors from Rawalpindi
Year of birth missing (living people)
People from Rawalpindi